Escape Club is an American reality television series that premiered on Sunday, June 8, at 10:00 pm ET/9:00 pm Central on E!. The winner of the series would have their bills paid for one year.

Cast
 Andrew Dean, 26
 Aundre Dean, 24
 Donny Ghilardi, 29
 Elly Kho, 31
 Jesse Blum, 28
 Lisa Baldassare, 25
 Lisa Tursini, 25
 Matt Heagy, 34
 Meagan Reedy, 26
 P'etra Davis, 22
 Stephen Bamber, 28
 Whitney Coulas, 25

Elimination order

 (WINNER) The contestant received the most votes and won the competition.
 (RUNNER-UP) The contestant received the second highest number of votes and was the runner-up.
 The contestant received the most votes and was eliminated.
 The contestant decided to leave the competition.
 The contestant had someone from their past come visit the house.
 The contestant was eliminated, but later voted back into the house.
 The contestant was never eliminated, but did not win the competition.
 The contestant was eliminated, but returned for the finale.

Episodes

References

External links
 
 
 

2010s American reality television series
2014 American television series debuts
2014 American television series endings
E! original programming
English-language television shows